USS Itasca or USS Itasca II has been the name of more than one United States Navy ship, and may refer to:

 , a steamer in commission from 1861 to 1865
 , later USS SP-810, a patrol boat employed as a hospital boat in commission from 1917 to 1919
 , a patrol boat in commission from 1918 to 1919

Itasca